Iris, Messenger of the Gods (French: "Iris, messagère des Dieux") (sometimes known as Flying Figure, or Eternal Tunnel) is a bronze sculpture by Auguste Rodin.  A plaster model, created between 1891 and 1894, was cast in bronze by Fonderie Rudier at various times from about 1895.  Iris is depicted with her right hand clasping her right foot and her naked body posed provocatively with her legs spread wide, displaying her genitalia.

Background
The sculpture was conceived in 1891 as part of Rodin's second (and ultimately unrealised) proposal to create a monument to Victor Hugo for a site outside the Panthéon in Paris.  Rodin received the commission in 1889, and he initially conceived a sculpture of Victor Hugo accompanied by three female figures representing Youth, Maturity and Old Age.  Over time, the project evolved, and the parts of the figures became separate sculptures, including Meditation, Tragic Muse, and Iris.  The figure that became Iris was intended to personify the "Spirit of the Nineteenth Century", or "Glory", hovering above the head of Hugo.

A simplified version of the Monument to Victor Hugo was later installed at the Palais Royale.

Description
The original sculpture depicted the Greek goddess Iris as a woman, with sweeping wings, and legs spread wide.  The pose recalls the uncompromising painting L'Origine du monde (1866) by Gustave Courbet (held in a private collection and still little unknown in 1890, but Rodin may have become acquainted with it through Edmond de Goncourt: Courbet's work gained wider exposure after being acquired by the Musée d'Orsay in 1981).  It also evokes the athleticism of a gymnast or dancer stretching.  The sculpture was probably from life, with the model lying on a bed or perhaps based on a can-can dancer.  Indeed, it may be inspired by Rodin's clipping of the Chahut dancer "Grille d'Egout" from an 1891 issue of the Gil Blas magazine.

A small early study of Iris retains the head.  The sculpture was altered in 1894, when it was enlarged by Rodin's assistant  and reoriented vertically, with the left arm and head removed leaving a fragmentary torso similar to that of a damaged statue from Classical antiquity.  It was catalogued as Study of a woman with legs apart in November 1894, and then cast in bronze at the Rudier Foundry.  A full-size cast held by the Musée Rodin measures .

A cast was exhibited at the Sixth Munich Secession exhibition in 1898, and then, under the title Another Voice, at Rodin's retrospective in a temporary pavilion at the  during the Exposition Universelle in 1900.  The work was initially very controversial due to its unabashed eroticism, so it was retained in Rodin's studio.  A cast owned by Edward Perry Warren was donated to the Museum of Fine Arts, Boston, in 1908, but the museum felt unable to exhibit the "unshowable" work, and sold it in 1953.  (Warren collected other controversial artworks:  he also owned the Warren Cup, and his donation of a stone version of Rodin's The Kiss to the local council in Lewes was returned as being unsuitable for public display.)  The Victoria and Albert Museum accepted the artist's donation of an early cast in 1914, cataloguing it as "Crouching Woman". Today, the official copies of the sculpture are kept in museums of Oslo, Zurich, Paris, Washington, Basel, New York, Los Angeles and Adelaide.

Iris has been described by the art historian Jane Mayo Roos as "open[ing] her thighs in a pose of candid, aggressive sexuality".  The critic Arthur Symons wrote that "All the force of the muscle palpitates in this strenuous flesh, the whole splendour of her sex, unveiled, palpitates in the air, the messenger of the gods, bringing some divine message, pauses in flight, an embodied inspiration". The sculpture has also drawn feminist criticism given Iris' sexually objectifying pose. In particular, the title of the pose suggests that the figure's sexual organ is her means of verbal communication. By removing them and repositioning the legs into their current confrontational pose, Rodin erases any sense of individualism in favor of anonymous carnality.

Versions

Examples of the sculpture exists in a number of smaller casts.

It was sold from the collection of Sylvester Stallone, who had nicknamed it the "flying beaver". Stallone had acquired it at auction in 2007 for £4.6m, then a record for Rodin. Lucian Freud also owned a copy for many years, which he placed at the end of his bed, making it the first thing he saw in the morning.

One was sold at Christie's in 2007 for US$880,000, and another at Bonham's in 2014 for US$509,000.

A  version is held by the Museum of Modern Art in New York, and the Metropolitan Museum of Art has a  version, cast in 1965.

The work may have influenced Marcel Duchamp's explicit peephole installation Étant donnés.  Some works of Francis Bacon show the influence of this sculpture, including his Lying Figure No. 1 (1959) and Reclining Woman (1961).

See also
List of sculptures by Auguste Rodin

References

 Iris, Messenger of the Gods, Musée Rodin
 Monument to Victor Hugo , Musée Rodin
 Monument to Victor Hugo , Musée Rodin
 Head of Iris, Victoria and Albert Museum
 Crouching Woman, Victoria and Albert Museum
 Iris, Museum of Modern Art
 Iris, Study with Head, Bowman Sculpture
 Iris, Messagère des Dieux (Messenger of the Gods), Study without Head, Small Model, Bowman Sculpture
 Iris, Messenger of the Gods, Metropolitan Museum of Art
  Iris, messagère des Dieux, Christie's, 9 May 2007
 Great Works: Iris, Messenger of the Gods (circa 1895), Auguste Rodin, The Independent, 26 November 2010
 Iris, messagère des dieux, étude sans tête, petit modèle, Bonham's, 4 November 2014
 "Rodin's explicit Iris and daring Freud nude go on sale for estimated £13m-plus", The Guardian, 27 January 2016
 Iris, messagère des dieux, Sotheby's, 3 February 2016
 Iris, messagère des dieux, Sotheby's, 9 May 2016 
 Francis Bacon, Lying Figure No. 1 (1959), www.francis-bacon
 Francis Bacon, Reclining Woman (1961), Tate

External links

1895 sculptures
Sculptures by Auguste Rodin
Bronze sculptures
Collections of the National Gallery (Norway)